Franz Guenthner is a German linguist who is a professor of Computational Linguistics at the Center for Information and Language Processing (CIS) at the Ludwig-Maximilians-Universität (LMU) in Munich, Germany.  His background is in philosophy and linguistics.

Guenthner's research interests include computational linguistics, and has collaborated to the development of a number of online search platforms since 1996, including AltaVista, Fast Search and Transfer (now purchased by Microsoft), and JobaNova. He was a professor of General and Computational Linguistics at the University of Tübingen (1977–1989) before joining the LMU in 1990.  His research interests include all areas of text processing and in particular the transformation of textual corpora in lexical and grammatical representations (i.e. computationally deployable electronic dictionaries and local grammars). He was also instrumental in the design and realization of a number of search engines, in particular of the first large-scale scientific search engine on the web www.scirus.com. Later work concerned the use of linguistic techniques in page and link analysis on the web, especially for the construction of vertical search engines.

See also
 Defeasible reasoning

References

External links
Personal page at CIS in Munich
2007 interview on the topic of online job search (in German)
Books and other Publications by Franz Guenthner
Profile as a Speaker at the 7th Annual Bielefeld Conference in Germany

Living people
Year of birth missing (living people)
Linguists from Germany
Academic staff of the Ludwig Maximilian University of Munich
Academic staff of the University of Tübingen
Corpus linguists